The Sandown Line is a short former industrial railway line in the western suburbs of Sydney, New South Wales, Australia. It began life as the Bennett's Railway, opening on 17 November 1888. 
The line diverges from the Carlingford line just south of Camellia station. 

It was electrified in 1959. Part of the line is to be reutilised by light rail.

The line had three simple passenger stations: Sandown, Hardies and Goodyear (a platform called Cream of Tartar Works closed prior to electrification). The closure of Goodyear station preceded the closure of the remaining two.

The Sandown line served a number of factories and industrial sites including a number of sidings and a marshalling yard known as Commonwealth Sidings that were added in 1943 to service a large military stores complex.  
There was a short branch line from the Commonwealth Sidings marshalling yard to Redbank Wharf and adjacent sidings. 
Another connection from Commonwealth Sidings joined the Carlingford line to the south of Rosehill station. 
The Commonwealth Sidings and marshalling yard and the southern connection progressively fell out of use after the end of World War 2 and were either removed or adapted for other uses and the branch line to Redbank Wharf was altered to connect with Sandown yard and then progressively dismantled. 

When electrified, the Sandown Line carried an electric suburban service to serve the surrounding industrial area. Passenger services for the Abattoirs line were operated by CPH railmotors operating from Sandown via Lidcombe until November 1984.

Passenger service to Sandown ceased on 19 December 1991, while freight service ended in June 2010. The line's racecourse platform at Rosehill continued to be used by special charter trains up to 2019.

The overhead wires were removed in December 2002. Traffic was officially suspended and a Stop Block placed across the tracks on the Sydney side of Access Rd level crossing in October 2016.

The western end of the line will be used by the Parramatta Light Rail project to provide access to a stabling and maintenance facility. This saw the line officially closed which was gazetted for 1 July 2019. The section of the Carlingford line from where the Sandown line diverges to the Parramatta Road level crossing will also be closed. Removal of the line and tracks began in July 2019. The branch is also under consideration for being incorporated into Stage 2 of the Parramatta Light Rail network, connecting Camellia and Olympic Park.

See also 

Railways in Sydney
List of closed Sydney railway stations

References

External links

Closed railway lines in Sydney
Standard gauge railways in Australia
Railway lines opened in 1892
Railway lines closed in 2010
Camellia, New South Wales
1892 establishments in Australia
2010 disestablishments in Australia